The Women's National Basketball Association's Rookie of the Year Award is an annual Women's National Basketball Association (WNBA) award given since the 1998 WNBA season, to the top rookie of the regular season. The winner is selected by a panel of sportswriters throughout the United States, each of whom casts a vote for first, second and third place selections. Each first-place vote is worth five points; each second-place vote is worth three points; and each third-place vote is worth one point. The player(s) with the highest point total, regardless of the number of first-place votes, wins the award.

The 2003 award winner Cheryl Ford and 2011 award winner Maya Moore are the only players to win both the WNBA Rookie of the Year award and a WNBA championship in the same season.

The 2008 award winner was Candace Parker who became the first player to win the award after garnering all possible votes and also the first player to win the WNBA Most Valuable Player Award in the same season. In the NBA, only Wilt Chamberlain and Wes Unseld have won the Most Valuable Player Award and Rookie of the Year Award in the same season.

The 2020 award winner, Crystal Dangerfield, is the first who was not chosen in the first round of the draft; she was chosen in the second round in 2020 as the 16th overall pick.

As of 2019, eight Rookie of the Year recipients have gone on to become a member of a WNBA championship team.

Winners

See also

 List of sports awards honoring women

References

Notes

Awards established in 1998
Rookie
Rookie player awards